Mandla Langa (born 1950 in Stanger, Durban) is a South African poet, short-story writer, novelist, and cultural activist. He grew up in KwaMashu township of Kwazulu Natal. His novel The Lost Colours of the Chameleon won the 2009 Commonwealth Writers' Prize (Africa region).
Langa enrolled for a degree in English and Philosophy at the University of Fort Hare, but was expelled in 1973 as a result of his involvement in the activities of the South African Student Organisation. In 1976, he went into exile and has lived in different countries of Southern Africa as well as in Hungary and the United Kingdom.

Langa was brought in to complete the second volume of Nelson Mandela's autobiography, left in an unfinished draft when Mandela died in 2013, and published in 2017 as Dare Not Linger: The Presidential Years.

Early life and education
Mandla Langa was born in Stanger, Durban, South Africa, in 1950 and grew up in KwaMashu township 20 miles north of Durban, during the implementation of the apartheid system. He is one of nine children. His brother Pius Langa served as Chief Justice in South Africa. Another brother, Bheki Langa, served as South Africa's ambassador to Russia. Mandla Langa attended Gardner Memorial School, Sibonelo High School in Durban, and then the University of Fort Hare. Despite the substantial number of political strikes during his college career, he was able to complete his BA in English and Philosophy in 1972. He taught at a high school in KwaMashu in 1973–74.

In 1974, he became actively involved as a director of the South African Students' Organization (SASO), maintaining this position until his arrest in 1976 for attempting to leave the country without a permit. As a result he served 101 days in jail. According to Charles Larson (editor of Under African Skies), Langa himself said that his arrest was due to sedition.

While imprisoned, Langa continued to improve his writing skills. After serving his sentence, he fled to Botswana, marking the start of his life in exile. He also spent time in Lesotho, Angola, where he participated in military training at the MK camps, also known as Umkhonto we Sizwe. In addition to Lesotho, Langa spent time in Mozambique, Zambia, Hungary and the UK. He held various ANC posts abroad, including cultural attaché in the UK and Western Europe.

Career

Literary work
Among Langa’s early published work are poems such as "Pension Jives" and "They No Longer Speak to Us in Song". In addition to writing poetry, he began writing prose. His story "The Dead Men Who Lost Their Bones" was his first to be published in Drum Magazine in 1980, winning a prize. Langa's success prompted his literary evolution to novel writing. In 1991, he became the first South African to be awarded an Arts Council of Great Britain Bursary for Creative Writing. Langa's diverse work includes penning an opera, Milestones, with music composed by jazz musician Hugh Masekela. In 1999, Milestones was featured at the Standard Bank Festival in Grahamstown.

His published books are Tenderness of Blood (1987), A Rainbow on a Paper Sky (1989), The Naked Song and Other Stories (1997), The Memory of Stones (2000), and The Lost Colours of the Chameleon (2008), which won the 2009  Commonwealth Writers Prize (Best Book in Africa). Head judge Elinor Sisulu said: "Langa deconstructs the inner workings of a mythical African state, laying bare the frailties of leaders too blinded by power to effectively confront the major challenges of their times."
.
Langa appeared at the 2011 Paris Book Fair.
He also be participated in the Bush Theatre's 2011 project Sixty-Six Books with a piece based upon a book of the King James Bible.

Langa was brought in to complete the follow-up volume to Nelson Mandela's 1994 autobiography Long Walk to Freedom. Based on Mandela's handwritten notes and a draft left unfinished when Mandela died in 2013, as well as archive material and interviews, Dare Not Linger: The Presidential Years by Nelson Mandela and Mandla Langa, with a prologue by Graça Machel, was published in 2017, its title taken from the closing sentence of Long Walk to Freedom: "But I can only rest for a moment, for with freedom comes responsibilities, and I dare not linger, for my long walk is not ended."

Administrative positions
Cultural Representative of the African National Congress (ANC)
July 2001–05: Chairperson of the first council of the Independent Communications Authority of South Africa (ICASA) – (merging of the IBA and the South African Telecommunications Regulatory Authority - SARRA)
Chairman of Board at MultiChoice South Africa

Currently Langa is serving on the following boards:
Business and Arts South Africa (BASA)
Foundation for Global Dialogue (FGD)
Institute for the Advancement of Journalism (IAJ)
The Rhodes University School for Economic Journalism
Trustee of the Nation's Trust
Trustee of the Read Educational Trust
Trustee of the South African Screen Writers' Laboratory (SCRAWL)
Director of Contemporary African Music and Arts (CAMA)

Media positions
April 1999 – June 2000: Chairperson of the Independent Broadcasting Authority
Langa served as a columnist for the Sunday Independent
Vice-Chairperson of the successful Africa '95 exhibition season in London.
Served on the board of the South African Broadcasting Corporation (SABC) after his position as program director
Editor-at-large of Leadership Magazine

Personal life
Langa has two daughters with his wife June Josephs. He has two brothers, Pius Langa who served as South African Chief justice and Bheki W. J. Langa who is a diplomat.

Awards and honours
In 2007, Langa received South Africa’s National Order of Ikhamanga (Silver) for literary, journalistic and cultural achievements, the citation specifying his "excellent contribution to the struggle against apartheid, achievements in the field of literature and journalism and contributing to post-apartheid South Africa through serving in different institutions". In February 2003, the Pan African Writers' Association (PAWA) featured Langa in an event promoting him as a distinguished South African writer: "An Evening with Mandla Langa".

Works

Fiction

The Lost Colours of the Chameleon. Picador Africa, 2008, 
 – a collection exploring the nature of South African society after the end of apartheid

A Rainbow on the Paper Sky. Kliptown Books, 1989
Tenderness of Blood. Zimbabwe Publishing House, 1987,

Non-fiction
 With Nelson Mandela, Dare Not Linger: The Presidential Years, Macmillan, 2017,

Collaborative works
2006: Youth 2 Youth: 30 Years after Soweto ’76 (Introduction by Mandla Langa, edited by George Hallett)
2004: Moving in Time: Images of Life in a Democratic South Africa (Introduction by Mandla Langa, edited by George Hallett)
2004: South Africa's Nobel Laureates: Peace, Literature and Science by Kader Asmal, David Chidester, and Wilmot Godfrey James (Introduction by Mandla Langa)

Collections
2004: Kader Asmal, David Chidester, and Wilmot Godfrey James (eds), South Africa's Nobel Laureates: Peace, Literature and Science —  Introduction by Mandla Langa. Jonathan Ball Publishers, South Africa.
1997: Charles R. Larson (ed.), Under African Skies: Modern African Stories. Farrar, Straus & Giroux; paperback Canongate Books, 2005.
1990: Elisa Segrave (ed.), Junky's Christmas, and other Yuletide Stories. Serpent's Tail.
1990: Sarah LeFanu and Stephen Hayward (eds), Colours of a New Day: Writing for South Africa. Lawrence & Wishart.

Other

Milestones – musical opera in collaboration with the jazz musician Hugh Masekela

References

External links
 @mandla_langa, Twitter

"Mandla Langa and Uwem Akpan Win the 2009 Commonwealth Writers' Prizes – Africa Region", Books Live, 11 March 2009.
"MANDLA LANGA", African Millionaire.
 "Mandla Langa", KZN Literary Tourism.
 "Profile Interview: Mandla Langa (Part 1)", Weekend Breakfast with Phemelo Motene, 3 June 2018.

South African male novelists
South African poets
South African male short story writers
South African short story writers
South African journalists
University of Fort Hare alumni
Living people
Prisoners and detainees of South Africa
1950 births
Writers from Durban
Recipients of the Order of Ikhamanga
South African male poets
20th-century South African novelists
21st-century South African novelists